Klyuchevka is a rural locality (a village) and the administrative centre of Razinsky Selsoviet, Fyodorovsky District, Bashkortostan, Russia. The population was 273 as of 2010. There are 2 streets.

Geography 
Klyuchevka is located 30 km southeast of Fyodorovka (the district's administrative centre) by road. Saitovo is the nearest rural locality.

References 

Rural localities in Fyodorovsky District